= NQA certification =

NQA Certification (NQA) provides environmental simulation testing, inspection, and certification services.

== History ==
Founded in 1988, NQA began issuing certifications in the United Kingdom (U.K.) and later globally. NQA certification verifies that an organization has received the proper training and support in management services for quality, environment, energy, health and safety, and information security for clients include NASA, Boeing, and Lockheed.

The certification service is part of National Technical Systems (NTS), which is a certification, testing, and inspection organization that acquired NQA in 2015.

NQA launched The NQA COVID SECURE Guideline Verification in 2020 supporting to help organisations in the UK return to work safely through an independent third party verification.

NQA employs more than 1,000 individuals as of 2020. The organization's primary areas of operation include the U.K, the United States (U.S.), Europe, the Middle East, Africa, and the Asia-Pacific region. In total, NQA has worked in more than 90 countries and has issued over 50,000 certifications.

Once NQA completes a third party assessment of an organization's management systems, that organization can then receive a certificate for that standard.
